The Gros-de-Vaud is an area of the Swiss canton of  Vaud.

Localisation 

The  Gros-de-Vaud lies between the cities of Lausanne and Yverdon on the North-South direction, and between Moudon and Orbe in the East-West axle. The community of Echallens is its centre and the head of the  Gros-de-Vaud district that was created on January 1, 2008.

Close to the Lausanne agglomeration (capital of the canton of Vaud), the Gros-de-Vaud is connected to it by the Lausanne-Echallens-Bercher (LEB) railroad.

See also
Gros-de-Vaud (district)
Swiss Plateau

Regions of Switzerland
Geography of Switzerland